Thèze is the name of 2 communes in France:

 Thèze, in the Alpes-de-Haute-Provence department
 Thèze, in the Pyrénées-Atlantiques department